Łaz  is a village in the administrative district of Gmina Zabór, within Zielona Góra County, Lubusz Voivodeship, in western Poland.

The village has a population of 480.

References

 Krzysztof Fedorowicz, Izabela Taraszczuk: Wspomnienie o Kaiserbergu, czyli Górze Cesarza koło Łazu/Erinnerung an den Kaiserberg bei Loos (Łaz), in: "Pro Libris", No 2/3 (31/32)/2010, pp. 85–90.   article on history of Kaiserberg and Loos (Łaz) 

Villages in Zielona Góra County